Avraham Yeshaya Karelitz (7 November 1878 – 24 October 1953), also known as the Chazon Ish after his magnum opus, was a  Belarusian-born Orthodox rabbi who later became one of the leaders of Haredi Judaism in Israel, where he spent his final 20 years, from 1933 to 1953.

Biography
Avraham Yeshaya Karelitz was born in Kosava, in the Grodno Governorate of the Russian Empire (now Brest Region, Belarus), the son of Shmaryahu Yosef Karelitz, the rabbi of Kosava; his mother was Rasha Leah, the daughter of Shaul Katzenelbogen. Avraham Yeshaya was born after his older brother Meir.
His younger brothers were Yitzchak and Moshe. Yitzchak succeeded their father as the rabbi of Kosava; he and his wife and daughter were shot to death in their home by the Germans in mid-1942.

His oldest sisters were Henya Chaya, Badana, Tzivia and Batya.  Karelitz's youngest sister, Pesha Miriam (Miril), married Rabbi Yaakov Yisrael Kanievsky. Kanievsky referred to his brother-in-law Avraham Yeshaya as his mentor as long as the latter was alive.

As a youth, Karelitz was sent to study under Chaim Soloveitchik of Brisk.  He did not take to the Brisker method of study, and later it became clear that he actually opposed it.  After a few days, he returned home and continued to study with his father who was head of the local Beth din. He married Bashe Bei of Kvėdarna and developed a close relationship with Moshe Rosen (Nezer HaKodesh).

He moved to Vilna in about 1920, and became close to Chaim Ozer Grodzinski, consulting with him in all religious and communal matters. Encouraged by Grodzinski and with Abraham Isaac Kook’s help, Karelitz settled in Eretz Israel, then the British Mandate of Palestine, in 1933. His house in Bnei Brak became the address for thousands who sought religious guidance.

Karelitz, his brother-in-law Kanievsky and Yaakov Galinsky were extremely close.

Karelitz devoted his life to the study of Torah while simultaneously gaining knowledge in secular sciences such as astronomy, anatomy, mathematics, and botany. After his marriage, he continued to lead an extremely modest life, his wife providing for their needs while he spent day and night studying Torah in-depth. He did not have any children.

Though he served as a religious leader for much of his life, he never received formal ordination as a rabbi.

Influence and authority
Karelitz did not publish many responsa, yet still achieved recognition as a leading authority on halakha. Like his brother-in-law Kanievsky,  Karelitz "held no official position but  nevertheless became a recognized worldwide authority on many matters relating to Jewish law and life."

He declined to participate in any of the religious-political movements which were very active prior to, and during, the formation of the State of Israel in 1948. Yet, he had an immense influence on Haredi Judaism in Israel, whose formative period coincided with his years in Israel.  He maintained an anti-Zionist viewpoint and begrudgingly accepted the existence of the Israeli state.

In recognition of his deep insight and interest in many fields of study, many sought his guidance on social and political issues.  David Ben-Gurion, the prime minister of Israel, and Yitzhak Ben-Zvi, who became the second president of Israel, visited him once to discuss political-religious issues.  Karelitz cited one of a pair of metaphors from the Talmudic discussion (Sanhedrin 32b): one is about two camels which meet on a narrow mountain pass as a metaphor. A camel without goods was expected to defer to a camel laden with goods; similarly,  Karelitz contended secular society should defer to religious society, which bore the "goods" of tradition.

Chazon Ish etrog
There is a variety of Balady citron in his name, which he certified for use as an etrog for the four species. After one Sukkot, Karelitz handed Michel Yehuda Lefkowitz a packet of seeds taken from the etrog he had used for the festival and instructed him to plant them in his yard. Lefkowitz, who had no agricultural experience, followed his mentor's instructions to plant and water it, and the tree grew and bore fruit. Every year Karelitz came to select his etrog for the holiday from the tree, as did his brother-in-law, Kanievsky, and other senior rabbis. Lefkowitz also allowed etrog growers to take cuttings from the tree to grow entire orchards of etrogim certified as kosher by Karelitz.

Halachic and philosophical positions
He believed that a halachic position taken by the Shulchan Aruch could not be reversed based on the new discovery of manuscripts of which the Shulchan Aruchs author was presumably unaware. This position is sometimes misunderstood to mean that no evidence from manuscripts may be used in the halachic process.

Published works
In 1911, he published his first work on Orach Chayim and other parts of the Shulchan Aruch in Vilna, anonymously under the title Chazon Ish, meaning "Vision of a man", with the word Ish alluding to the first letters of his two names (אברהם יש'''עיה), similar to Yaakov Emden's pen-name "Yaavetz". In later years, he became almost exclusively known by the title Chazon Ish.

Although essentially an academic scholar, he applied himself to practical problems, devoting much effort to the strengthening of religious life and institutions. His rulings on the use of the milking machine on Shabbat and on cultivation by hydroponics during the sabbatical year are two illustrations of his practical approach. Karelitz wrote over 40 books in Hebrew.

In contrast to other great achronim such as Chaim Soloveitchik, Karelitz is known for avoiding formulaic or methodical analysis of Talmudic passages, instead preferring a more varied and intuitive approach similar to that of the rishonim. Karelitz also discounted the need to delve into musar as a formal study, feeling that a life dedicated to traditional Torah study would guide one toward the proper path. He particularly rejected elements of the Novardok philosophy, such as their extreme self-effacement and self-abasement.

In one of his regular lectures, Aharon Leib Steinman spoke about studying Kabbalah, and related that Karelitz had vast knowledge in Kabbalah. Karelitz studied with a secret kabbalist known as "The Baker of Kosovo."

Recently translated into English is his philosophical essay Emunah Ubitachon (Faith and Trust) discussing his approach to faith and trust in God.

A fictionalized portrait of Karelitz by his onetime disciple, the Yiddish poet and novelist Chaim Grade, is to be found in Grade's epic novel Tsemakh Atlas: Di Yeshive', translated into English as The Yeshiva. Karelitz appears there as "Reb Avraham-Shaye Kosover."

A number of multi-volume biographies have been published about Karelitz, including Pe'er Hador, and the more recent Maaseh Ish, both in Hebrew.

A 1,000-page academic biography of Karelitz by Benny Brown was published by Magnes Press in 2011. The contents of this academic biography were subsequently debated by Brown and Joshua Envel in the journal Yeshurun, Vol. 30. In the following edition of Yeshurun, Vol. 31, Envel presented his own hypothesis how to systematically conceptualize the methodology of Karelitz. Envel's approach was then the subject of correspondence with several readers in Yeshurun, Vol. 32. More recently, a chapter from Brown's book was translated and published in Ḥakirah, Vol. 24.

References

Further reading 
 Chazon Ish. Faith & Trust. Translated by Y. Goldstein. Am Asefer.2008. 

1878 births
1953 deaths
20th-century English rabbis
Anti-Zionist Haredi rabbis
Ashkenazi rabbis in Mandatory Palestine
Authors of books on Jewish law
Belarusian Haredi rabbis
Haredi rabbis in Israel
Haredi rabbis in Mandatory Palestine
People from Bnei Brak
People from Kosava, Belarus
People from Slonimsky Uyezd
Rabbis in Bnei Brak